Elections to the Tripura Tribal Areas Autonomous District Council (TTAADC) were held on 5 March 2005.

The election result was a landslide victory for the Left Front. The Left Front, with 71.63% of the votes cast, won all 28 seats that were up for election. 21 seats went to the Communist Party of India (Marxist), 4 seats for NSPT, one seat to the Communist Party of India, one seat for RSP and one seat to the All India Forward Bloc.

The Indigenous Nationalist Party of Twipra was the second largest party with 13.22% vote share and Indian National Congress emerged as a third-largest party in the election with 12.70% of the votes.

Results

See also
 2015 Tripura Tribal Areas Autonomous District Council election
 2010 Tripura Tribal Areas Autonomous District Council election

References

2005 elections in India
Elections in Tripura
History of Tripura (1947–present)
Autonomous district council elections in India
Local elections in Tripura